Ankyrin repeat and zinc finger domain-containing protein 1 is a protein that in humans is encoded by the  ANKZF1 gene.

References

External links

Further reading 

 
 
 
 

Human genes
Proteins